SS Fazilka was a  steamship with a length of , breadth of  and draught of . She was built by William Doxford and Sons for the British-India Steam Navigation Company (B.I.S.N.) in 1890. She had triple expansion, 462 nhp, steam engines with a top speed of 12.5 knots.

Indentured labour ship 
On 31 October 1904, the Fazilka was used to carry migrants from London to Brisbane, but she was primarily used for the transportation of Indian indentured labourers to the colonies. Details of some of these voyages are as follows:

Troop ship 
Fazilka was used to carry troops from India to South Africa during the Boer war. She left Port Natal on 30 January 1900 to make the return trip to India. Four days after passing through the Mozambique Channel the tail shaft broke. The shaft had broken in two places partially rupturing the stern tube, so the first requirement was to shift ballast and get the stern out of the water. Attempts were made to rig sails but progress was slow and after an attempt to tow, the engineers under Mr. Brown worked in intolerable conditions to repair the shaft. The repairs were complicated and after various failures it was decided to take down the high pressure engine and use the bottom end brasses as a clamp. This was effective in holding the shaft and then the rear end breakage was connected by a Thomson coupling. This was one of the most heroic ship repairs at sea and the Engineers were rewarded accordingly. John Macdonald, the 4th Engineer receiving a Gold watch and the sum of £30.

Fazilka was wrecked on 31 October 1919, on the east coast of Great Nicobar Island. She was on a voyage from Penang to Calcutta, carrying passengers and a general cargo.

See also 
 Indian Indenture Ships to Fiji
 Indian indenture system

External links 
Queensland Migrant 
 A History of the British India Steam Navigation Company Limited
 The Ships List
 BIShip

References 

Ships built on the River Wear
1890 ships
Ships of the British India Steam Navigation Company
Shipwrecks in the Indian Ocean
Indian indenture ships to Fiji
Maritime incidents in 1919
Victorian-era passenger ships of the United Kingdom